Dionysius Balaban (monastic name – Hilarion; ; ? – 10 May 1663, in Chyhyryn) was the Metropolitan of Kiev, Galicia and all Ruthenia in the Ecumenical Patriarchate of Constantinople in the Eastern Orthodox Church from 1657 to 1663. He came from an old noble family from Volhynia. He was known as a religious and political leader. He was a defender of the rights of the metropolis against the attempts of its liquidation by the Patriarchate of Moscow.

Balaban studied at the Kyiv Mohyla Academy. He was a bishop of Kholm (1650–1652), Lutsk (1655) and later the Metropolitan of Kyiv (1657–1663).

In 1658 Balaban was forced to relocate his see to Chyhyryn due to occupation of Kyiv by the Muscovite troops. At the same time his place in Kyiv was kept (locum tenens) by the bishop of Chernihiv Lazar Baranovych.

Metropolitan Balaban supported the policies of Hetman Ivan Vyhovsky and was a co-author of the 1658 Treaty of Hadiach. In 1663 he accepted monastic vows of Yuriy Khmelnytskyi to the Kaniv Monastery.

Notelist

References 
 Dionysius Balaban at the Encyclopedia of Ukraine
 Dionysius Balaban at Encyclopedia of History of Ukraine

Metropolitans of Kiev, Galicia and all Rus' (1620-1686)
Eastern Orthodox bishops of Lutsk
Ruthenian nobility of the Polish–Lithuanian Commonwealth
1663 deaths
Year of birth unknown
People from Volhynian Voivodeship
Constantinople Exarchs of Ukraine
Orthodox bishops of the Cossack Hetmanate